The Destiny World Tour was the third concert tour by the Jacksons to promote the group's Destiny album. The tour began on January 22, 1979, with their opening concert in Bremen, West Germany. They visited 3 continents and 14 countries, playing approximately 85 concerts in the United States alone. The tour concluded in Hawaii on January 13, 1980.

Overview
The tour began on January 22, 1979, in Bremen, West Germany shortly after the release of the Destiny album the previous December. The tour visited  three continents including concerts in Africa and Europe before taking on a 79-city tour in the United States. The Jacksons took a four-month break from touring starting June 1979 so lead singer Michael Jackson could finish working on his solo album Off the Wall. The first leg of the tour saw the Jacksons playing moderate sized arenas, such as the Valley Forge Music Fair in Philadelphia which seats 3,000, but after the release of Michael's album Off the Wall, the brothers revamped their show for larger arenas. For the second leg, additional songs were added to the setlist, most notably songs from Michael's new album. The opening act in the second leg was L.T.D. The tour grossed an estimated 7.5 million dollars.

Set list

Tour dates

Cancelled dates

 6 unknown dates in Britain was cancelled due to Michael’s strained voice

Personnel
Michael Jackson: vocals
Jackie Jackson: vocals
Tito Jackson: guitar, vocals
Marlon Jackson: vocals
Randy Jackson: vocals, congas, percussion, piano, keyboards

Band members
First leg
Bass: Michael McKinney
Additional Guitar: Bud Rizzo
Keyboards: James McField
Drums: Tony Lewis

Second leg
Drums: Jonathan Moffett
Additional Guitar: Bud Rizzo
Bass: Michael McKinney
Keyboards: James McField 
Horns: (East Coast Horns): Wesley Phillips, Cloris Grimes, Alan (Funt) Prater, Roderick (Mac) McMorris

References

Notes

Citations

The Jacksons concert tours
1979 concert tours
1980 concert tours